Robert Tough, known also as "Red", (born August 28, 1920 – April 7, 1999) was an American professional basketball player. He spent two seasons in the National Basketball Association (NBA). He played as a member of the Fort Wayne Pistons in the final season of the Basketball Association of America before it was folded into the NBA. During Tough's second season he played for two teams, the Baltimore Bullets and the Waterloo Hawks. Before playing professional basketball, Tough attended St. John's University.

BAA/NBA career statistics

Regular season

References 
 

1920 births
1999 deaths
American men's basketball players
Baltimore Bullets (1944–1954) players
Basketball players from New York City
Fort Wayne Pistons players
Forwards (basketball)
Guards (basketball)
St. John's Red Storm men's basketball players
Undrafted National Basketball Association players
Waterloo Hawks players